Lymanske (until 1948: Frecăţei) is a selo in Izmail Raion in the southern Ukrainian oblast of Odesa. Lymanske belongs to Reni urban hromada, one of the hromadas of Ukraine. It is situated on the north-western bank of Lake Kagul. 

Until 18 July 2020, Lymanske belonged to Reni Raion. The raion was abolished in July 2020 as part of the administrative reform of Ukraine, which reduced the number of raions of Odesa Oblast to seven. The area of Reni Raion was merged into Izmail Raion.

References

External links
  Lymanske

Villages in Izmail Raion
Reni Hromada